The 2020–21 Manhattan Jaspers basketball team represented Manhattan College in the 2020–21 NCAA Division I men's basketball season. The Jaspers, led by tenth-year head coach Steve Masiello, played their home games at Draddy Gymnasium in Riverdale, New York as members of the Metro Atlantic Athletic Conference. They finished the season 7–13, 6–12 in MAAC play to finish in a tie for ninth place. As the No. 10 seed in the MAAC tournament, they lost in the first round to No. 7 seed Fairfield 58–59 in overtime.

Previous season
The Jaspers finished the 2019–20 season 13–18 overall, 8–12 in MAAC play to finish in a tie for eighth place. As the #9 seed in the MAAC tournament, they defeated #8 seed Fairfield 61–43 in the first round, before losing to #1 seed Siena 49–63 in the quarterfinals.

Roster

Schedule and results 

|-
!colspan=12 style=| Regular season

|-
!colspan=12 style=| MAAC tournament
|-

|-

Sources

References

Manhattan Jaspers basketball seasons
Manhattan Jaspers
Manhattan Jaspers basketball
Manhattan Jaspers basketball